Harry Haywood (February 4, 1898 – January 4, 1985) was an American political activist who was a leading figure in both the Communist Party of the United States (CPUSA) and the Communist Party of the Soviet Union (CPSU). His goal was to connect the political philosophy of the Communist Party with the issues of race.

In 1926, he joined other African-American Communists and travelled to the Soviet Union to study the effect of Communism on racial issues found in the United States. His work there resulted in his selection to be the head of the Communist Party's Negro Department. The party platform changed by the late 1930s and began to stray away from advocating for African-American self-determination. As the party's platform changed over time, Haywood lost his stance within the party. His work also included creating a group to help the Scottsboro boys case.

Haywood was also an author. His first book was Negro Liberation, published in 1948. After he was expelled from his affiliating party, he wrote an autobiography called Black Bolshevik, which was also published in 1978. He contributed major theory to Marxist thinking on the national question of African Americans in the United States. He was also a founder of the Maoist New Communist movement.

Biography

Early years
Harry Haywood was born Haywood Hall, Jr., on February 4, 1898, in South Omaha, Nebraska, to former slaves Harriet and Haywood Hall, from Missouri and West Tennessee, respectively. They had migrated to Omaha because of jobs with the railroads and meatpacking industry, as did numerous other southern blacks. South Omaha also attracted White immigrants, and ethnic Irish had established an early neighborhood there. Haywood was the youngest of three sons.

In 1913 after their father was attacked by whites, the Hall family moved to Minneapolis, Minnesota. Two years later in 1915 they moved to Chicago. During World War I, he served with the Eighth Regiment, a black United States regiment. Upon his return to Chicago, the younger Hall was radicalized by the bitter Red Summer of 1919, especially the Chicago race riot, in which mostly ethnic Irish attacked blacks on the South Side.

Hall was influenced by his older brother Otto, who joined the Communist Party in 1921 and invited Hall to enter the secret African Blood Brotherhood. He was also influenced by theories he read of in Vladimir Lenin's State and Revolution as a teen. He stated, in his autobiography Black Bolshevik, that "this work was the single most important book I had read in the entire three years of my political search and was decisive in leading me to the Communist Party."

Military service
Haywood's military career included service in three wars. His interest in military combat began when his friends recalled tales of their service in the Eighth Illinois, Black National Guard Regiment. During World War I, he served with the Eighth Regiment, a black United States regiment. In the Spanish Civil War, like many Americans there, he fought for the Popular Front with the Abraham Lincoln Battalion of the International Brigades. Haywood held the position of Regimental Commissar in the XV International Brigade during the Battle of Brunete. While in Spain he, Langston Hughes and Walter Benjamin Garland broadcast from Madrid in support of the Republican cause. During World War II, he served in the Merchant Marine, where he was active with National Maritime Union.

Career with the Communist Party USA
Harry Haywood began his revolutionary career by joining the African Blood Brotherhood in 1922, followed by the Young Communist League in 1923. Soon after in 1925, he joined the Communist Party, USA (CPUSA). After joining the CPUSA, Haywood went to Moscow to study; it was on his passport application that he first adopted the pseudonym "Harry Haywood", deriving it from the first names of his mother and father. In Moscow, he studied first at the Communist University of the Toilers of the East in 1925, then at the International Lenin School in 1927. The anticolonial revolutionaries he met while in Moscow included Vietnamese leader Ho Chi Minh. He began to advocate for African-American concerns, arguing that they were captives in the United States and that "they must embrace nationalism in order to avoid the harmful effects of integration." He stayed until 1930 as a delegate to the Communist International (Comintern).

Haywood was General Secretary of the League of Struggle for Negro Rights, but he was active in issues involving working-class Whites as well. In the early 1930s, while head of the CPUSA Negro Department, he led the movement to support the Scottsboro Boys; organized miners in West Virginia with the National Miners Union; and was a leader in the struggles of the militant Sharecroppers' Union in the Deep South. In 1935 he led the "Hands off Ethiopia" campaign in Chicago's Black South Side to oppose Italy's invasion of Ethiopia. When eleven Communist leaders were tried under the Smith Act in 1949, Haywood was assigned the task of research for the defense.

In the CPUSA, Haywood served on the Central Committee from 1927 to 1938 and on the Politburo from 1931 until 1938. He also participated in the major factional struggles internal to the CPUSA against Jay Lovestone and Earl Browder, regularly siding with William Z. Foster.

The Comintern and the Black Belt nation

During his four-and-half-year stay in the Soviet Union (1925–1930), Harry Haywood held dual membership in both the CPUSA and the CPSU. As a member of the CPSU, he traveled extensively in the Soviet Union's autonomous republics, and participated in the struggles against both the Left Opposition headed by Leon Trotsky and the Right Opposition led by Nikolai Bukharin. In these struggles and in others, Haywood was on the side of Joseph Stalin. While working as a delegate for the Comintern, he served on commissions dealing with the question of African Americans in the United States, as well as the development of the "Native Republic Thesis" for the South African Communist Party. Haywood worked to draft the "Comintern Resolutions on the Negro Question" of 1928 and 1930, which stated that African Americans in the Southern part of the United States made up an oppressed nation, with the right to self-determination up to and including secession. He would continue to fight for this position throughout his life.

He believed that a distinct African-American nation had developed that satisfied the criteria laid out by Stalin in his Marxism and the National Question: a historically constituted, stable community of people, formed on the basis of a common language, territory, economic life, and psychological makeup manifested in a common culture. Because African Americans in the South constituted such a nation, Haywood believed the correct response was a demand for self-determination, up to and including the right to separate from the United States. Their "national territory" was historically the South, and they deserved full equality everywhere else in the United States. Haywood believed that only with genuine political power, which from a Marxist point of view included control of the productive forces, such as land, could African Americans obtain genuine equality. Their gaining of equality was a prerequisite for broader working class unity.

Most of those in the CPUSA who disagreed with Haywood considered the question of African-American oppression a matter of racial prejudice with moral roots, rather than an economic and political question of national oppression. They saw it as a problem to be solved under Socialism and in no need of special attention until after the institution of the revolutionary Dictatorship of the Proletariat. They criticized him for falling "into the bourgeois liberal trap of regarding the fight for equality as primarily a fight against racial prejudices of whites." To this charge, Haywood countered that the category of "race" is a mystification. He believed that relying on race and ignoring economic questions could only alienate African Americans and inhibit working-class unity.

Following the Great Migration of millions of blacks to the North and Midwest, accompanied by their urbanization, critics attempted to use statistics to counter the Black Belt theory and show there no longer was a black nation centered in the South. In his 1957 article, "For a Revolutionary Position on the Negro Question", Haywood responded that the question of an oppressed nation in the South was not one of "nose counting."

Harry Haywood's 1948 book, Negro Liberation,  was the first major study of the African-American national question written by an African-American Marxist. He argued that the root of the oppression of Blacks was the unsolved agrarian question in the South. He believed that the unfinished bourgeois democratic revolution of Reconstruction had been betrayed in the Hayes-Tilden Compromise of 1877. It abandoned African Americans to plantations as tenant farmers and sharecroppers, faced with the Redeemer governments, the system of Jim Crow laws, and the terror of the Ku Klux Klan and other paramilitary groups. According to Haywood, the rise of imperialism left blacks frozen as "landless, semi-slaves in the South." According to Haywood's autobiography, Paul Robeson subsidized his work on the project by offering $100 a month. It was translated and published in Russian, Polish, German, Czech and Hungarian. It was reprinted in 1976 by Liberator Press, the publishing arm of the October League. Haywood argued that "the position of the book was not new, but a reaffirmation of the revolutionary position developed at the Sixth Comintern Congress in 1928. The heart of this position is that the problem is fundamentally a question of an oppressed nation with full rights of self-determination. It emphasized the revolutionary essence of the struggle for Black equality arising from the fact that the special oppression of Blacks is a main prop of the system of imperialist domination over the entire working class and the masses of exploited American people. Therefore the struggle for Black liberation is a component part of the struggle for proletarian revolution. It is the historic task of the working-class movement, as it advances on the road to socialism, to solve the problem of land and freedom of the Black masses." On the other hand, Haywood went on to write, "What was new in the book was the thorough analysis of the concrete conditions of Black people in the post-war period. I made extensive use of population data; the 1940 census, the 1947 Plantation Count and other sources, in order to show that the present day conditions affirmed the essential correctness of the position we had formulated years before." Because of this and other works, Robert F. Williams called Harry Haywood "one of the modern pioneers in the Black liberation struggle."

Expulsion from the CPUSA
Following the death of Stalin in 1953 and Nikita Khrushchev's rise to power, the CPUSA followed Khrushchev's policy of destalinization and "peaceful coexistence". Long an admirer of Mao Zedong, Harry Haywood was one of the pioneers of the anti-revisionist movement born out of the growing Sino-Soviet split. He was driven out of the CPUSA in the late 1950s along with many others who took firm anti-revisionist or pro-Stalin positions.

The CPUSA's decision to change its position on the African-American national question was a central factor in Haywood's expulsion. Though the CPUSA had not been as active in the South since the dissolution of the Sharecroppers Union, in 1959 the CPUSA officially dropped its demand for self-determination for African Americans there. (The demand had been dropped earlier when Browder liquidated the party in 1944.) The CPUSA instead held that as American capitalism developed, so too would Black-White unity.

In 1957 he wrote "For a Revolutionary Position on the Negro Question" (later published by Liberator Press) but was unsuccessful at changing the direction of the Party. In 1959, Haywood, although no longer a functioning party member, attempted to intervene one last time. He wrote "On the Negro Question", which was distributed at the Seventeenth National Convention by and in the name of African Blood Brotherhood founder Cyril Briggs. This was not effective, however, as most of Haywood's potential allies had already been expelled from the CPUSA in the name of combatting "left"-sectarianism and dogmatism.

In Haywood's view, "White chauvinism" in the party, rather than an accurate analysis of the economic issues, had caused the change in position. He also argued that the change prevented the CPUSA from giving appropriate leadership as the Civil Rights Movement developed. He believed the Party was left behind actions of Dr. Martin Luther King Jr. and the NAACP. The Party was even more alienated from the militant Black Power Movement that was to follow.

Political Activities 1950s–1980s

Haywood and his wife Gwendolyn Midlo Hall were among the founders of the Provisional Organizing Committee for a Communist Party (POC), formed in New York City in August 1958 by 83 mostly Black and Puerto Rican and White trade unionists, mainly coal miners from Williamsport, Pennsylvania and maritime workers including Al Lannon, Director of the Maritime Section of the CPUSA for many years, all delegates from the CPUSA. Its membership included Coleman Young, later elected the first black mayor of Detroit, and Theodore W. Allen, best known later for his "White skin privilege" theory and widely acclaimed historical writings. According to Haywood, the POC rapidly degenerated into an isolated, dogmatic, ultraleft sect, completely removed from any political practice. Nevertheless, the (POC) did release many highly trained organizers from the dead hand of the CPUSA as the civil rights and the black power movement began to hit the streets. In 1964, Haywood worked in Harlem with Jesse Gray, leader of the Harlem Rent Strike and Tenants' Union later elected to the New York State Legislature from Harlem. Haywood worked with Malcolm X in 1964 until his assassination in 1965, and with James Haughton and Josh Lawrence in Harlem Fight-Back, then in Oakland, California, in 1966, then in Detroit, Michigan, with the Detroit Revolutionary Union Movement (DRUM) and the League of Revolutionary Black Workers. Haywood then returned to Mexico for a short time and then to the United States permanently in 1970 invited by Vincent Harding, then Director of the Institute for the Black World in Atlanta, Georgia.

In 1964, Haywood began to become involved with the New Communist Movement, the goal of which was to found a new vanguard Communist Party on an anti-revisionist basis, believing the CPUSA to have deviated irrevocably from Marxism-Leninism. He later worked in one of the newly formed Maoist groups of the New Communist Movement, the October League, which became the Communist Party (Marxist-Leninist). In the CP(M-L) Haywood served on the Central Committee. He published his autobiography Black Bolshevik although some of his important writings and political life during the 1960s were edited out. For example, the manuscript he wrote with the acknowledged collaboration with Gwendolyn Midlo Hall and was dedicated to Robert F. Williams was not mentioned. This work, circulated in mimeographed form from early 1964 throughout California and the Deep South, deeply influenced the armed self-defense movement against the Ku Klux Klan during 1964 and 1965 and projected a slogan widely picked up throughout the Deep South that we must pose our own challenge to order and stability to counter the challenge posed by "massive resistance" by Southern politicians and racist terrorists. Black Bolshevik became an important book widely cited by scholars and read by the wider public as well. Through it and his other writings, Haywood provided ideological leadership far beyond the New Communist Movement. Haywood's theoretical contributions had a substantial impact on the major, and numerous warring factions of the New Communist Movement well beyond his own CP(M-L), including, for example, the League of Revolutionary Struggle (Marxist-Leninist), the early Revolutionary Communist Party, the Revolutionary Workers Headquarters and the Communist Workers Party. Nonetheless, lack of experience, sectarianism, and voluntarism played a major role in keeping the young Maoist groups from taking a strong leading role. In his last published article, Haywood wrote that the New Communist movement spent too much time and energy seeking the "franchise" of governments and parties outside the United States without validating itself among the people of our own country.

Haywood's theoretical contributions to questions of African-American national oppression and national liberation remain highly valued by the Ray O. Light Group, which developed out of an anti-revisionist split from the Communist Party USA in 1961, Freedom Road Socialist Organization, which was originally formed from the mergers of several New Communist Movement groups in the 1980s, and the Maoist Internationalist Movement as well as by many black revolutionaries and activists today. Haywood's role in the black protest movements during the 1960s through the 1980s can be studied at the Harry Haywood Papers, Manuscript, Archives, and Rare Books Division, Schomburg Center for Research in Black Culture in New York City and Harry Haywood Collection, Bentley Historical Library, University of Michigan, Ann Arbor.

Haywood's theoretical innovations have been influential in a range of scholarship including historical materialism, geography, Marxist education, and social movement theory, among others.

Marriage and family
In 1920, Haywood married a woman named Hazel, but they separated the same year.

While he was in Los Angeles in the late 1930s or 1940, he married Belle Lewis, whom he had known for years. They divorced in 1955.

In 1956, Haywood married Gwendolyn Midlo, a Jewish activist from New Orleans, Louisiana. She has been active in civil rights throughout her life. She also has become a prominent historian of slavery in the United States and Latin America, and of the African diaspora. She made her academic career at Rutgers University. They had three children, whom Midlo Hall mostly provided for alone. They are Dr. Haywood Hall (b. 1956), Dr. Rebecca Hall (b. 1963), and a third child from a previous marriage, Leonid A. Yuspeh (b. 1951.)

Haywood and Midlo Hall remained married until his death in 1985. Between 1953 and 1964, they collaborated on numerous articles, including some published in Soulbook Magazine, founded in Berkeley, California, in 1964. She did not follow him into the New Communist Movement, and they mostly lived apart after late 1964. Shortly before Haywood's expulsion from the Communist Party, he moved with his family to Mexico City, Mexico. During these years, Midlo Hall earned her bachelor's and master's degrees in history at Mexico City College. She returned with Haywood to the United States in 1964 working as a temporary legal secretary, started teaching in North Carolina in 1965, enrolled in graduate school in 1966, and earned her doctorate in 1970 at the University of Michigan. From there, she went to work as an assistant professor at Rutgers University, where she made her academic career and advanced to full professor. Midlo Hall has taught Africans in the Atlantic World at Michigan State University, as Adjunct Professor of History.

Death and legacy
Haywood died in January 1985, and was buried in Arlington National Cemetery in Arlington, Virginia. (Columbarium Court 1, Section LL, Column 7, 2nd Row from bottom.  Interred under birth name "Haywood Hall.")  He had a service-related disability and spent the last few years of his life at a Veterans Administration medical facility.  The Harry Haywood papers are housed at the Bentley Historical Library, University of Michigan, Ann Arbor, Michigan, and at the Manuscript, Archives, and Rare Books Division, Schomburg Center for Research in Black Culture, New York Public Library, New York City.
In Richard Wright's autobiographical novel Black Boy (American Hunger), the character of Buddy Nealson is said to represent Haywood.

See also
Communists in the United States Labor Movement (1919–37)
Communists in the United States Labor Movement (1937–50)
The Communist Party USA and African-Americans
Civil rights movement (1896–1954)
Timeline of Racial Tension in Omaha, Nebraska
Black nationalism
Black separatism

Footnotes

Other sources consulted

 Max Elbaum, Revolution in the Air: Sixties Radicals Turn to Lenin, Mao, and Che. New York: Verso, 2006.
 William Z. Foster, History of the Communist Party of the United States. New York: International Publishers, 1952.
 Lance Hill,Deacons for Defense: Armed Resistance and the Civil Rights Movement. Chapel Hill, NC: University of North Carolina Press, 2004.
 Robin D.G. Kelley, Hammer & Hoe: Alabama Communists During the Great Depression. Chapel Hill, NC: University of North Carolina Press, 1990.
 William Eric Perkins, "Harry Haywood (1898-1985)," in Mari Jo Buhle, Paul Buhle, Dan Georgakas, Eds. Encyclopedia of the American Left. New York: Garland, 1990.
 Cedric J. Robinson, Black Marxism: The Making of the Black Radical Tradition. Chapel Hill, NC: University of North Carolina Press, 2000.

Works

 The Communist Position on the Negro Question. With Earl Browder and Clarence Hathaway. New York: Workers Library Publishers, 1931.
 Lynching: A Weapon of National Oppression. With Milton Howard. New York: International Publishers, 1932.
 The Road to Negro Liberation: Report to the Eighth Convention of the Communist Party of the USA. New York: Workers Library Publishers, 1934.
 The South Comes North in Detroit's Own Scottsboro Case. New York: League of Struggle for Negro Rights, n.d. [1930s].
 Negro Liberation. New York: International Publishers, 1948. —Reissued by Liberator Press, Chicago, 1976.
  Articles from Soulbook, 1965–1967.
 Harry Haywood, For a Revolutionary Position on the Negro Question. Chicago: Liberator Press, 1975.
 Harry Haywood, Black Bolshevik: Autobiography of an Afro-American Communist. Liberator Press, Chicago: 1978.

Further reading

 Dawson, Michael C. Black Visions. The Roots of Contemporary African-American Political Ideologies. University of Chicago Press, Chicago: 2001.
 Foster, William Z. History of the Communist Party of the United States. International Publishers, New York: 1952.
 Foster, William Z. The Negro People in American History. International Publishers, New York: 1954.
 Gilmore, Glenda Elizabeth. Defying Dixie. The Radical Roots of Civil Rights 1919–1950. W.W. Norton & Company, New York 2008.
 Howard, Walter T. Black Communists Speak on Scottsboro. A Documentary History. Temple University Press, Philadelphia: 2008.
 Howard, Walter T. We Shall Be Free!: Black Communist Protests in Seven Voices. Philadelphia, PA: Temple University Press, 2013.
 Kelley, Robin D. G. Hammer and Hoe: Alabama Communists During the Great Depression. University of North Carolina Press, Chapel Hill: 1990.
 Kelley, Robin D. G. and Betsy Esch, "Black Like Mao: Red China and Black Revolution", in Afro-Asia: Revolutionary Political and Cultural Connections Between African Americans and Asian Americans. Fred Ho and Bill V. Mullen, Eds. Duke University Press, Durham: 2008; pp. 97–155.
 Solomon, Mark.The Cry Was Unity. Communists and African Americans, 1917–1936. University of Mississippi Press, Jackson: 1998.

External links

Harry Haywood Internet Archive
Documents from School on Afro-American National Question. Important texts from New Communist Movement groups based on theories put forward by Haywood.
The Third International and the Struggle for a Correct Line on the African American National Question. May 2006 text presented by Freedom Road Socialist Organization to the Workers Party of Belgium
Harry Haywood Papers Bentley Historical Library, Ann Arbor, Michigan.

1898 births
1985 deaths
Activists for African-American civil rights
Members of the Communist Party USA
African-American life in Omaha, Nebraska
American Comintern people
Marxist theorists
American Maoists
Abraham Lincoln Brigade members
African-American politicians
Anti-revisionists
Politicians from Omaha, Nebraska
American sailors
Military personnel from Omaha, Nebraska
United States Army soldiers
African-American trade unionists
American expatriates in the Soviet Union
Burials at Arlington National Cemetery
Communist University of the Toilers of the East alumni
International Lenin School alumni
African-American communists
African-American history of Nebraska
African-American Marxists